Coles is a given name and may refer to:

Coles Bashford (1816–1878), American lawyer and politician, fifth Governor of Wisconsin
Coles Phillips (1880–1927), American artist and illustrator
Coles Trapnell (1910–1999), American television producer, writer, and director
Coles Whalen, Americana, pop and country singer-songwriter based in Denver

See also
Coles (disambiguation)
Coles (surname)